CBS Columbia may refer to:

KRCG, the CBS television affiliate in Columbia, Missouri
WLTX, the CBS television affiliate in Columbia, South Carolina

See also
Columbia Records, an American record label owned by CBS 1938–1988